A Mathematician's Apology is a 1940 essay by British mathematician G. H. Hardy, which offers a defence of the pursuit of mathematics. Central to Hardy's "apology" – in the sense of a formal justification or defence (as in Plato's Apology of Socrates) – is an argument that mathematics has value independent of possible applications. Hardy located this value in the beauty of mathematics, and gave some examples of and criteria for mathematical beauty. The book also includes a brief autobiography, and gives the layman an insight into the mind of a working mathematician.

Background

Hardy felt the need to justify his life's work in mathematics at this time mainly for two reasons. Firstly, at age 62, Hardy felt the approach of old age (he had survived a heart attack in 1939) and the decline of his mathematical creativity and skills.
By devoting time to writing the Apology, Hardy was admitting that his own time as a creative mathematician was finished. In his foreword to the 1967 edition of the book, C. P. Snow describes the Apology as
"a passionate lament for creative powers that used to be and that will never come again".
In Hardy's words, "Exposition, criticism, appreciation, is work for second-rate minds. [...] It is a melancholy experience for a professional mathematician to find himself writing about mathematics. The function of a mathematician is to do something, to prove new theorems, to add to mathematics, and not to talk about what he or other mathematicians have done."

Secondly, at the start of World War II, Hardy, a committed pacifist, wanted to justify his belief that mathematics should be pursued for its own sake rather than for the sake of its applications. He began writing on this subject when he was invited to contribute an article to Eureka, the journal of The Archimedeans (the Cambridge University student mathematical society). One of the topics the editor suggested was "something about mathematics and the war", and the result was the article "Mathematics in war-time". Hardy later incorporated this article into A Mathematician's Apology. 

He wanted to write a book in which he would explain his mathematical philosophy to the next generation of mathematicians; that would defend mathematics by elaborating on the merits of pure mathematics solely, without having to resort to the attainments of applied mathematics in order to justify the overall importance of mathematics; and that would inspire the upcoming generations of pure mathematicians. Hardy was an atheist, and makes his justification not to God but to his fellow man.

Hardy initially submitted A Mathematician's Apology to Cambridge University Press with the intention of personally paying for its printing, but the Press decided to fund publication with an initial run of four thousand copies.

Summary

One of the main themes of the book is the beauty that mathematics possesses, which Hardy compares to painting and poetry.  For Hardy, the most beautiful mathematics was that which had no practical applications in the outside world (pure mathematics) and, in particular, his own special field of number theory.  Hardy contends that if useful knowledge is defined as knowledge which is likely to contribute to the material comfort of mankind in the near future (if not right now), so that mere intellectual satisfaction is irrelevant, then the great bulk of higher mathematics is useless.  He justifies the pursuit of pure mathematics with the argument that its very "uselessness" on the whole meant that it could not be misused to cause harm.  On the other hand, Hardy denigrates much of the applied mathematics as either being "trivial", "ugly", or  "dull", and contrasts it with "real mathematics", which is how he ranks the higher, pure mathematics.

Hardy expounds by commenting about a phrase attributed to Carl Friedrich Gauss that "Mathematics is the queen of the sciences and number theory is the queen of mathematics." Some people believe that it is the extreme non-applicability of number theory that led Gauss to the above statement about number theory; however, Hardy points out that this is certainly not the reason. If an application of number theory were to be found, then certainly no one would try to dethrone the "queen of mathematics" because of that. What Gauss meant, according to Hardy, is that the underlying concepts that constitute number theory are deeper and more elegant compared to those of any other branch of mathematics.

Another theme is that mathematics is a "young man's game", so anyone with a talent for mathematics should develop and use that talent while they are young, before their ability to create original mathematics starts to decline in middle age. This view reflects Hardy's increasing depression at the wane of his own mathematical powers. For Hardy, real mathematics was essentially a creative activity, rather than an explanatory or expository one.

Critiques
Hardy's opinions were heavily influenced by the academic culture of the universities of Cambridge and Oxford between World War I and World War II.

Some of Hardy's examples seem unfortunate in retrospect. For example, he writes, "No one has yet discovered any warlike purpose to be served by the theory of numbers or relativity, and it seems unlikely that anyone will do so for many years." Since then number theory was used to crack German Enigma codes and much later, figure prominently in public-key cryptography. 

The applicability of a mathematical concept is not the reason that Hardy considered applied mathematics somehow inferior to pure mathematics, though; it is the simplicity and prosiness that belong to applied mathematics that led him to describe them as he did. He considers that Rolle's theorem, for example, cannot be compared to the elegance and preeminence of the mathematics produced by Évariste Galois and other pure mathematicians, although it is of some importance for calculus.

Notes

References
  Full text

External links

 Full text of An Annotated Mathematician's Apology, an annotated edition including Hardy's essay ‘Mathematics in war-time’, with commentary on the context and legacy of the Apology.

1940 non-fiction books
Biographies and autobiographies of mathematicians
Apologetics
Aesthetics books
Cambridge University Press books
Books about mathematics
Books about Cambridge
Books about Oxford
History of the University of Cambridge
History of the University of Oxford